Raoul Caudron (born 7 December 1883 in Paris - died 1 June 1958 in Saint Étienne) was a French football Coach

In 1930 Caudron coached France in the first FIFA World Cup. He might not have coached the team had it not been for the secondment of Gaston Barreau who was forced to stay in France due to his work.

1883 births
1958 deaths
French football managers
France national football team managers
1930 FIFA World Cup managers